Mehdi Mollapour (born June 14, 1973) is a British-American Biochemist and Cancer Biologist. He is a Professor, Vice Chair for Translational Research and Director of Renal Cancer Biology Program for the Department of Urology, and Adjunct Professor at the Department of Biochemistry and Molecular Biology at SUNY Upstate Medical University.

Education 
Mollapour holds a BSc (Hons) in Microbiology and Biochemistry from the University of East London, MSc in Applied Molecular Biology of Infectious Diseases and Diploma in Tropical Medicine & Infectious Diseases from the London School of Hygiene & Tropical Medicine. In 2001 he received his PhD in Biochemistry from the University College London.

Academic career 
Mollapour completed his postdoctoral research at the University of Sheffield and in 2006 he received the Federation of European Societies (FEBS) fellowship.

He joined the laboratory of Dr Len Neckers in Urological Oncology Branch, (Chief Dr. W. Marston Linehan), at the National Cancer Institute as a research fellow in 2007.

In 2013 he joined the Department of Urology at the Upstate Medical University as an Assistant Professor. He became the Director of the Kidney Cancer Program within the same department in 2015.

In 2018 he became the Professor of Urology and Adjunct Professor of Biochemistry and Molecular Biology at SUNY Upstate Medical University. He was also named the Vice Chair for Translational Research for the Department of Urology in the same year.

Research

Molecular Chaperones
Mollapour is widely recognized for his research on post-translation regulation of the molecular chaperone Heat shock protein-90 (Hsp90) and co-chaperones in cancer. His work demonstrated how reversible biochemical reactions can become directional and ordered, and in general, how a house-keeping machine (Hsp90) can be modulated through signaling inputs. Mollapour’s finding on post-translational modifications of the Hsp90 chaperone machinery has also explained the reasons for tumors sensitivity and selectivity towards the Hsp90 inhibitors.

Tuberous Sclerosis Complex and Birt–Hogg–Dubé syndrome (BHD)

Mollapour’s laboratory has discovered the tumor suppressor TSC1 and FNIPs function as the new co-chaperones of Hsp90. These two proteins are involved in Tuberous Sclerosis Complex and Birt–Hogg–Dubé syndrome (BHD) syndromes respectively. His research has identified a cross-talk between these two co-chaperones and demonstrated interconnectivity and compensatory mechanisms between the BHD and TSC pathways.

Kidney Cancer

Mutations and loss of function of the Von Hippel-Lindau (VHL) tumor suppressor gene play a causal role in the pathogenesis of clear cell renal carcinomas (ccRCC), a pathological subtype that accounts for the majority kidney cancer each year. Mollapour work has shown that VHL ubiquitinates protein phosphatase-5 (PP5) for proteasomal degradation in a hypoxia- and prolyl-hydroxylation-independent manner. VHL-deficient ccRCC cell lines and patient tumors exhibit elevated PP5 levels. Downregulation of PP5 causes activation of the extrinsic apoptotic pathway in ccRCC cells, suggesting a prosurvival role for PP5 in kidney cancer.

Mollapour’s research group has been supported by grants from the National Institutes for General Medical Science and the National Cancer Institute to design and examine novel therapeutic strategies for patients with kidney, bladder and breast cancer. Mollapour’s h-index, based on 6725 citations, is 42.

Metabolism and the Warburg Effect 
Aerobic glycolysis in cancer cells, also known as the “Warburg effect”, is driven by hyperactivity of lactate dehydrogenase-A (LDHA). Mollapour’s team has identified the human tumor suppressor folliculin (FLCN) as a binding partner and uncompetitive inhibitor of LDHA. Their work has provided a new paradigm for the regulation of glycolysis. Cancer cells that experience the Warburg effect show FLCN dissociation from LDHA. Mollapour’s lab has shown that treatment of these cancer cells with a decapeptide derived from the FLCN loop region caused cell death, therefore providing a new avenue for targeted therapy in these cancers.

Recognition 

 2019 Fellow of Cell Stress Society International
2017 Society for Basic Urological Research Young Investigator
 2017 American Urological Association Research Scholar
 2013 Early Career Award, Cell Stress Society International
 2010 Intramural National Cancer Institute (NCI) Fellow and Young Investigator of the Year
 2010 Scholar-in-training award, American Association for Cancer Research (AACR)
 2006 Federation of European Biochemical Societies Research Fellowship (FEBS)

Selected publications 

Sager RA, Woodford MR, Backe SJ, Makedon AM, Baker-Williams AJ, DiGregorio BT, Loiselle DR, Haystead TA, Zachara NE, Prodromou C, Bourboulia D, Schmidt LS, Linehan WM, Bratslavsky G, Mollapour M. Post-translational Regulation of FNIP1 Creates a Rheostat for the Molecular Chaperone Hsp90. Cell reports. 2019;26(5):1344-56 e5. Epub 2019/01/31. doi: 10.1016/j.celrep.2019.01.018. PubMed ; PubMed Central PMCID: PMCPMC6370319.

Woodford MR, Hughes M, Sager RA, Backe SJ, Baker-Williams AJ, Bratslavsky MS, Jacob JM, Shapiro O, Wong M, Bratslavsky G, Bourboulia D, Mollapour M. Mutation of the co-chaperone Tsc1 in bladder cancer diminishes Hsp90 acetylation and reduces drug sensitivity and selectivity. Oncotarget. 2019;10(56):5824-34. doi: 10.18632/oncotarget.27217. PubMed ; PubMed Central PMCID: PMCPMC6791385.

Sager RA, Woodford MR, Mollapour M. The mTOR Independent Function of Tsc1 and FNIPs. Trends Biochem Sci. 2018;43(12):935-7. Epub 2018/10/27. doi: 10.1016/j.tibs.2018.09.018. PubMed .

Sager RA, Woodford MR, Neckers L, Mollapour M. Detecting Posttranslational Modifications of Hsp90. Methods Mol Biol. 2018;1709:209-19. doi: 10.1007/978-1-4939-7477-1_16. PubMed .

Sager RA, Woodford MR, Shapiro O, Mollapour M, Bratslavsky G. Sporadic renal angiomyolipoma in a patient with Birt-Hogg-Dube: chaperones in pathogenesis. Oncotarget. 2018;9(31):22220-9. doi: 10.18632/oncotarget.25164. PubMed ; PubMed Central PMCID: PMCPMC5955167.

Woodford MR, Sager RA, Marris E, Dunn DM, Blanden AR, Murphy RL, Rensing N, Shapiro O, Panaretou B, Prodromou C, Loh SN, Gutmann DH, Bourboulia D, Bratslavsky G, Wong M, Mollapour M. Tumor suppressor Tsc1 is a new Hsp90 co-chaperone that facilitates folding of kinase and non-kinase clients. EMBO J. 2017. doi: 10.15252/embj.201796700. PubMed .

Dushukyan N, Dunn DM, Sager RA, Woodford MR, Loiselle DR, Daneshvar M, Baker-Williams AJ, Chisholm JD, Truman AW, Vaughan CK, Haystead TA, Bratslavsky G, Bourboulia D, Mollapour M. P hosphorylation and Ubiquitination Regulate Protein Phosphatase 5 Activity and Its Prosurvival Role in Kidney Cancer. Cell reports. 2017;21(7):1883-95. doi: 10.1016/j.celrep.2017.10.074. PubMed . 
  
Bratslavsky G, Woodford MR, Daneshvar M, Mollapour M. Sixth BHD symposium and first international upstate kidney cancer symposium: latest scientific and clinical discoveries. Oncotarget. 2016. doi: 10.18632/oncotarget.7733. PubMed .

Woodford MR, Dunn D, Miller JB, Jamal S, Neckers L, Mollapour M. Impact of Posttranslational Modifications on the Anticancer Activity of Hsp90 Inhibitors. Adv Cancer Res. 2016;129:31-50. doi: 10.1016/bs.acr.2015.09.002. PubMed .

Woodford MR, Dunn DM, Blanden AR, Capriotti D, Loiselle D, Prodromou C, Panaretou B, Hughes PF, Smith A, Ackerman W, Haystead TA, Loh SN, Bourboulia D, Schmidt LS, Marston Linehan W, Bratslavsky G, Mollapour M. The FNIP co-chaperones decelerate the Hsp90 chaperone cycle and enhance drug binding. Nature communications. 2016;7:12037. doi: 10.1038/ncomms12037. PubMed ; PubMed Central PMCID: PMCPMC4931344.

Woodford MR, Dunn DM, Ciciarelli JG, Beebe K, Neckers L, Mollapour M. Targeting Hsp90 in Non-Cancerous Maladies. Curr Top Med Chem. 2016. PubMed .

Woodford MR, Truman AW, Dunn DM, Jensen SM, Cotran R, Bullard R, Abouelleil M, Beebe K, Wolfgeher D, Wierzbicki S, Post DE, Caza T, Tsutsumi S, Panaretou B, Kron SJ, Trepel JB, Landas S, Prodromou C, Shapiro O, Stetler-Stevenson WG, Bourboulia D, Neckers L, Bratslavsky G, Mollapour M. Mps1 Mediated Phosphorylation of Hsp90 Confers Renal Cell Carcinoma Sensitivity and Selectivity to Hsp90 Inhibitors. Cell reports. 2016d;14(4):872-84. doi: 10.1016/j.celrep.2015.12.084. PubMed .

Dunn DM, Woodford MR, Truman AW, Jensen SM, Schulman J, Caza T, Remillard TC, Loiselle D, Wolfgeher D, Blagg BS, Franco L, Haystead TA, Daturpalli S, Mayer MP, Trepel JB, Morgan RM, Prodromou C, Kron SJ, Panaretou B, Stetler-Stevenson WG, Landas SK, Neckers L, Bratslavsky G, Bourboulia D, Mollapour M. c-Abl Mediated Tyrosine Phosphorylation of Aha1 Activates Its Co-chaperone Function in Cancer Cells. Cell reports. 2015;12(6):1006-18. doi: 10.1016/j.celrep.2015.07.004. PubMed .

Mollapour M, Bourboulia D, Beebe K, Woodford MR, Polier S, Hoang A, Chelluri R, Li Y, Guo A, Lee MJ, Fotooh-Abadi E, Khan S, Prince T, Miyajima N, Yoshida S, Tsutsumi S, Xu W, Panaretou B, Stetler-Stevenson WG, Bratslavsky G, Trepel JB, Prodromou C, Neckers L. Asymmetric Hsp90 N Domain SUMOylation Recruits Aha1 and ATP-Competitive Inhibitors. Mol Cell. 2014;53(2):317-29. doi: 10.1016/j.molcel.2013.12.007. PubMed .

Walton-Diaz A, Khan S, Bourboulia D, Trepel JB, Neckers L, Mollapour M. Contributions of co-chaperones and post-translational modifications towards Hsp90 drug sensitivity. Future medicinal chemistry. 2013;5(9):1059-71. doi: 10.4155/fmc.13.88. PubMed .

Personal life 
Mollapour is married to Dimitra Bourboulia, PhD, Associate Professor, Assistant Dean for Undergraduate and Graduate Medical Education Research, and Director for the Office of Research for Medical Students, at SUNY Upstate Medical University.

References

External links 

 Mollapour Lab 
 Mehdi Mollapour on Twitter
 Upstate Medical University Department of Urology 
 Upstate Medical University Department of Biochemistry and Molecular Biology

1973 births
Living people
Cancer researchers
Biochemistry educators